Cornelius O'Callaghan ( – 3 January 1742) was an Irish politician.  He sat in the Irish House of Commons as a Member of Parliament (MP) for the borough of Fethard in County Tipperary from 1713 to 1714.

References 

1680 births
1742 deaths
Members of the Parliament of Ireland (pre-1801) for County Tipperary constituencies
Irish MPs 1713–1714
Cornelius